Lamadaya are waterfalls that are located in the Cal Madow mountain range in the eastern Sanaag region of Somaliland. The meaning of the word in the Somali language is "not to be looked at", owing to the waterfalls' steep incline atop a high hill. The nearest town to Lamadaya is Ulheed, which is situated towards the Red Sea coast.

Gallery

See also

References

Waterfalls of Somalia
Sanaag